Constantino Reis (born 1961) is a former Mozambican sprinter. He competed in the men's 200 metres and the men's 400 metres at the 1980 Summer Olympics.

References

External links
 

1961 births
Living people
Athletes (track and field) at the 1980 Summer Olympics
Mozambican male sprinters
Olympic athletes of Mozambique
Date of birth missing (living people)
Place of birth missing (living people)